is a passenger railway station  located in the city of Minamiashigara, Kanagawa Prefecture, Japan, operated by the Izuhakone Railway.

Lines
Daiyūzan Station is a terminus of the Daiyūzan Line, and is located 9.6 kilometers from the opposing terminus at Odawara Station.

Station layout
The station consists of one island platform connected to a  connected to a one-story station building.

Platforms

Adjacent stations

Station history
Daiyūzan Station was opened on October 15, 1925.

Passenger statistics
In fiscal 2019, the station was used by an average of 2,458 passengers daily (boarding passengers only).

The passenger figures (boarding passengers only) for previous years are as shown below.

Bus services
 Izuhakone Bus
 for Doryoson (Saijoji Temple)
 Hakone Tozan Bus
 for Odakyu Shin-Matsuda Station
 for Odakyu Kaisei Station via Wadagahara Station
 for Jizodo via Yagurasawa, for Ashigara Man'yo koen (Ashigara Pass)

Surrounding area
Minamiashigara City Hall
Minamiashigara City Cultural Center
Minamiashigara Elementary School

See also
List of railway stations in Japan

References

External links

Izuhakone Railway home page 

Railway stations in Japan opened in 1925
Izuhakone Daiyuzan Line
Railway stations in Kanagawa Prefecture
Minamiashigara, Kanagawa